Franz-Josef Kemper (born 30 September 1945) is a German athlete, Olympian, and official. He achieved his greatest success as a middle-distance runner in the 1960s and 1970s.

Sports career
Kemper won five German outdoor titles in the 800 metres, in 1965, 1966, 1967, 1970 and 1971. In 1966, he set a new European 800 metres record as well as world records in the 1,000 metres and the 4×800 metres relay. He took part in the 1968 Summer Olympics in Mexico City, and finished fourth in the 800 metres at the 1972 Summer Olympics in Munich.

In 1967, Kemper was awarded the Silberne Lorbeerblatt, the highest German athletics award.

Official career
Kemper studied sports, and German language and literature, at the University of Münster and sociology at the Technische Hochschule Darmstadt. At the TH Darmstadt, he received a Doctor of Philosophy in 1980.

Since the year 2000, Kemper has been the assistant director and director of the sports department and holds an honorary position in the Ministry of the Interior and Sport in Rhineland Palatinate. In March 2003, he was appointed by the council of ministers of the federal states as the national delegate to the 2006 FIFA World Cup. He has held this office since 15 April 2004.

In 1989 Kemper married Sylvia Schenk, a jurist and former Olympic 800 m runner.

Honorary appointments
1989–1993: Kemper belonged to the Presidium of the Deutschen Leichtathletik-Verbandes (DLV).
1989–1998: A member of the Federal Board on Popular Sports in the Deutschen Sportbund (DSB).
1995–1998: Chairman of the Working Group on "Sports in Health" of the DSB.

References

1945 births
Living people
West German male middle-distance runners
Athletes (track and field) at the 1968 Summer Olympics
Athletes (track and field) at the 1972 Summer Olympics
Olympic athletes of West Germany
European Athletics Championships medalists
Universiade medalists in athletics (track and field)
Universiade gold medalists for West Germany
People from Steinfurt (district)
Sportspeople from Münster (region)
Technische Universität Darmstadt alumni
Medalists at the 1967 Summer Universiade
Medalists at the 1970 Summer Universiade